The Western Band Association (WBA) is a nonprofit organization that promotes high school music education in California, Arizona and Nevada. Specifically, the WBA organizes many marching band competitions for high school students. Its championships event is considered to be the second-largest single marching contest in the country.

In addition to marching band events, WBA also organizes concert band festivals, symposia, and musical and leadership clinics. In 2008, over 12,000 students in 133 bands performed in WBA events in multiple competitions hosted throughout the state.

History 
The Western Band Association was started in 1979 by marching band directors from five Northern and Central California high schools: Mike Rubino (Live Oak High School), Ramiro Barrera (James Logan High School), Dan Smith (Independence High School), Gary Runsten (Modesto High School) and Mel Stratton (Clovis High School).

In 1984, Gary Gilroy (Moreau High School) coined the name "WSMBC" Western States Marching Band Conference, which would later be shortened to WBA by Ramiro Barrera (James Logan High School) in 2002. The first WSMBC Championship was held in conjunction with the 1984 Music Bowl Prelims at James Logan High School. In 1995, John Hannan (Mission Viejo High School) helped expand the organization's efforts to include Southern California bands as well.

In recent years, bands have also competed under the "WBA" banner from nearby states, including Washington, Oregon, and Nevada. The scoring system also grew to become a two-tiered criteria based curriculum designed for bands of various size memberships, assuring that the small band would have the same opportunity as the large band to achieve a high score measuring their unique orchestration and design options.

In 2006, the competition schedule has grown to offer consecutive contests in each of the three Regions (Northern, Central and Southern California) helping to alleviate the costs of travel for the bands.

In 2012, James Logan High School and Ayala High School tied for first place at the WBA Championships, with both scoring 93.40. However, the tie was broken based on Ayala's General Effect score. The tiebreaker settled Ayala as the WBA Champions.

Scoring system 
Each individual judge is assigned to a specific caption (Individual and Ensemble Music, Individual and Ensemble Visual, General Effect, Auxiliary, and Percussion). General Effect and Music are each worth 30% of the total score, Visual is worth 20%, and Auxiliary and Percussion are each worth 10%.

Awards are released by division. The band with the highest award points for each caption per division is awarded a caption award, while the band with the most overall points in each division is awarded first place-prize. The band with most points in A/AA/AAA combined classes and AAAA/AAAAA combined classes are awarded a "sweepstakes award", with that band removed from the rankings of their class; the next band in placement in that class is moved to "first place" and so on (only for that class). Each competition will have two Sweepstakes winners, one each for A/AA/AAA and AAAA/AAAAA.

Marching band circuit 

The WBA organizes a marching band circuit with competitions held throughout October and November leading up to the circuit championship competition. Classifications were updated in 2021. There are currently five divisions:
Class 1A: 45 performers or less
Class 2A: 46-65 performers
Class 3A: 66-85 performers
Class 4A: 86-115 performers
Class 5A: 116 performers or more
Classifications prior to 2021 beginning 2004:
 Class A: Bands with up to 60 members
 Class AA: Bands with up to 80 members
 Class AAA: Bands with up to 100 members
 Class AAAA: Bands with up to 140 members
 Class AAAAA: Bands with more than 140 members
Prior to 2004, there were only four divisions. The original Class AA was expanded to two classes, now AA and AAA. AAA and AAAA became the current AAAA and AAAAA classes. Prior to this (before 2000), WBA had A-60, A-90, AA, and AAA as the classifications.

Class champions at the WBA Championships are determined at the conclusion of preliminary competition at championships. After prelims, the bands then move on to one of two finals competitions: the A/AA/AAA Championship and the AAAA/AAAAA Championship. The top three bands from each division move on to their respective championship and the remaining field is filled by the next highest scoring bands.

The Finals field is composed of:

 The top 3 bands from each of Class A, AA, and AAA, then the next highest 6 bands from those 3 classifications combined (regardless of class and score) for a total of 15 bands in finals.
The top three bands from each of Class AAAA and AAAAA, then the next highest 9 bands from those 2 classifications combined (regardless of class and score) for a total of 15 bands in finals.

Past champions 
Below is an incomplete list of past class champions and sweepstakes winners:

Class champions

Sweepstakes winners

Combined A/AA/AAA Grand Champions 
Previously known as the Class A/AA Championship.

Combined AAAA/AAAAA Grand Champions 
Previously known as the AAA/AAAA Championship.

 Denotes a tie overall score. However, the tie was broken by a higher general effect score.

Regional Championships 
 The 2021 season had Regional Championships held at 1 site in each region.

See also 
 Bands of America
 Northwest Association for Performing Arts
 Southern California School Band and Orchestra Association
 Tournament of Bands

References

External links

Music organizations based in the United States
High school marching bands from the United States
Organizations established in 1979